Cumia schoutanica is a species of sea snail, a marine gastropod mollusk in the family Colubrariidae.

Description

Distribution
This species is distributed in Australian waters along Queensland, Victoria and Tasmania.

References

External links

Colubrariidae
Gastropods described in 1910